David Gilmore (born 5 February 1964) is an American jazz guitarist.

Gilmore studied at New York University with Joe Lovano and Jim McNeely. In 1987 he began working professionally with the M-Base Collective and Ronald Shannon Jackson. In the 1990s he was a member of the  jazz fusion band Lost Tribe. In 1995, he became a member of Wayne Shorter's band. With his brother Marque Gilmore, Matt Garrison, and Aref Durvesh, he recorded Ritualism in 2001. With Christian McBride, Jeff "Tain" Watts, and Ravi Coltrane he recorded Unified Presence. Gilmore was the sole composer on all but one song and also served as the producer of the album.

He has worked with Muhal Richard Abrams, Geri Allen, Cindy Blackman Santana, Ron Blake, Randy Brecker, Don Byron, Uri Caine, Steve Coleman, Alice Coltrane, Jack DeJohnette, Dave Douglas, Melissa Etheridge, Robin Eubanks, Rachelle Ferrell, Trilok Gurtu, Isaac Hayes, Graham Haynes, Cyndi Lauper, Branford Marsalis, Wynton Marsalis, Meshell Ndegeocello, Joan Osborne, Greg Osby, Lonnie Plaxico, Dianne Reeves, Sam Rivers, David Sanborn, Boz Scaggs, Mavis Staples, Joss Stone, Steve Williamson, and Cassandra Wilson.

Discography

As leader
 Ritualism (Kashka Music, 2000)
 Unified Presence (RKM Music, 2006)
 Numerology: Live at Jazz Standard (Evolutionary Music, 2012)
 Energies of Change (Evolutionary Music, 2015)
 Transitions (Criss Cross, 2017)
 From Here to Here (Criss Cross, 2020)

As sideman
With Don Byron
 No-vibe Zone (Knitting Factory, 1996)
 Bug Music (Nonesuch, 1996)
 Nu Blaxploitation (Capitol, 1998)
 You Are #6 (Blue Note, 2001)
 Do the Boomerang (Blue Note, 2006)

With Steve Coleman
 Sine Die (Pangaea, 1988)
 Cipher Syntax (JMT, 1989) 
 Rhythm People (The Resurrection of Creative Black Civilization) (RCA Novus, 1990)
 Black Science (RCA/Novus, 1991)
 Drop Kick (RCA/Novus, 1992)
 The Tao of Mad Phat (RCA/Novus, 1993)
 Genesis & the Opening of the Way (BMG/RCA Victor, 1997)
 The Ascension to Light (BMG, 2001)

With others
 Muhal Richard Abrams, Think All, Focus One (Black Saint, 1995)
 Aka Moon, Guitars (W.E.R.F., 2002)
 Aka Moon, Invisible Moon (Carbon 7, 2001)
 Ralph Alessi, This Against That (RKM Music, 2002)
 Ron Blake, Lest We Forget (Mack Avenue, 2003)
 Ron Blake, Sonic Tonic (Mack Avenue, 2005)
 Uri Caine, Love Fugue: Robert Schumann (Winter & Winter, 2000)
 Uri Caine, Gustav Mahler: Dark Flame (Winter & Winter, 2003)
 Ann Hampton Callaway, Blues in the Night (Telarc, 2006)
 Vincent Chancey, Welcome Mr. Chancey (In+Out 1993)
 Theo Croker, Afro Physicist (DDB, Okeh 2014)
 Wayne Escoffery, The Humble Warrior (Smoke Sessions 2020)
 Trilok Gurtu, Believe (CMP, 1994)
 Trilok Gurtu, Bad Habits Die Hard (CMP, 1996)
 Graham Haynes, What Time It Be! (Muse, 1991)
 Mike Holober, Thought Trains (Sons of Sound, 2004)
 Cary Hudson, The Phoenix (Glitterhouse, 2002)
 Brad Jones, Uncivilized Poise (Knitting Factory, 1999)
 Boris Kozlov, Conversations at the Well (Criss Cross, 2016)
 Carolyn Leonhart, Steal the Moon (Sunnyside, 2000)
 M-Base, Anatomy of a Groove (DIW, 1992)
 Rudresh Mahanthappa, Samdhi (ACT, 2011)
 Christian McBride, Sci-Fi (Verve, 2000)
 Christian McBride, Vertical Vision (Warner Bros., 2002)
 Monday Michiru, Episodes in Color (SAR, 2002)
 Roy Nathanson, Fire at Keaton's Bar & Grill (Six Degrees, 2000)
 Meshell Ndegeocello, The World Has Made Me the Man of My Dreams (Bismillah, 2007)
 Lonnie Plaxico, Iridescence (Muse, 1991)
 Lonnie Plaxico, Short Takes (Muse, 1992)
 Renee Rosnes, Life On Earth (Blue Note, 2001)
 Adam Rudolph, Turning Towards the Light (Cuneiform, 2015)
 Wayne Shorter, High Life (Verve, 1995)
 Omar Sosa, Across the Divide (Half Note, 2009)
 Jeff "Tain" Watts, Detained at the Blue Note (Half Note, 2004)
 Beau Williams, Bodacious! (Funkytowngrooves, 2011)
 Steve Williamson, A Waltz for Grace (Verve, 1990)
 Steve Williamson, Rhyme Time (Verve, 1991)
 Cassandra Wilson, Jumpworld (JMT, 1990)
 Cristina Zavalloni, The Soul Factor (Via Veneto, 2014)

References

External links

20th-century American guitarists
21st-century American guitarists
American jazz guitarists
1964 births
Living people
Musicians from Cambridge, Massachusetts
New York University alumni
American session musicians
Guitarists from Massachusetts
American male guitarists
Jazz musicians from Massachusetts
20th-century American male musicians
21st-century American male musicians
American male jazz musicians
Criss Cross Jazz artists